The Samsung Comeback (SGH-T559) is a mobile phone announced by T-Mobile on 22 July 2009 and released in Q3 2009. The phone has a full QWERTY keyboard, and is primarily a messaging phone, though it does have internet capability.

Overview
The Comeback has a 2.0-megapixel camera, an HTML browser with Flash Lite, 3G support, stereo Bluetooth, and a music player that supports MP3, AAC/AAC+, WMA, MPEG4, WAV, MIDI, and RealAudio formats. It has an SAR of 1.35 watts per kilogram.

The phone comes in White/Cherry Red or Grey/Plum colors.
The Alphanumeric keypad glows orange on both color choices.

References
Samsung Comeback (retrieved 16-02-2010)
Samsung Comeback phone details from T-Mobile (retrieved 16-02-2010)
Samsung Comeback review at CNET (retrieved 16-02-2010)

Samsung mobile phones
Mobile phones introduced in 2009